Rain's World is the fourth Korean-language studio album by South Korean pop and R&B singer Rain. Two years after his last album, Rain finally came back with his fourth album. Building on the success of its predecessor, the album further established him as one of the top musical acts in Southeast Asia. a repackaged album was released on December 22, 2006.

Commercially, the album peaked at number one on the Korean monthly album chart issue for October 2006, becoming Rain's first monthly number-one album. It was the ninth best-selling album of the year in South Korea, selling over 106,000 copies.

Release and reception 
Two years after his last album, Rain finally comes back with his fourth album. By January 2007, the album sold 108,179 copies in South Korea. The success of the album lead to a repackage album with a new album art as well as two versions: A type (CD+DVD Set) and B Type (CD+DVD+Diary Set).  CD contains remixed 'Bad Guy', 'I'm Coming', 'I' And 'With U' added to films of 4th album recording, jacket picture shooting session, a music video taping. B Type re-pack, which was limited to 5,000 copies, was a seasonal item for the Fall of the year with a high quality diary that has Rain's pictures undisclosed to the public.

Promotion and live performances 

To promote the release, Rain went on a world tour. The tour started in Seoul and included stops in the US, Japan, China, Singapore, and more. His concert at the Tokyo Dome on May 25, 2007, attracted nearly 40,000 people and marked the first time aa Korean artist performed at the Tokyo Dome.

Accolades

Track listing

Charts

Weekly charts

Monthly charts

Year-end charts

References

Rain (entertainer) albums
JYP Entertainment albums
2006 albums
Korean-language albums